John Hogan VC (8 April 1884 – 6 October 1943) was an English recipient of the Victoria Cross, the highest and most prestigious award for gallantry in the face of the enemy that can be awarded to British and Commonwealth forces.

Hogan was born in Royton, Lancashire, England.

On 2 January 1915 Hogan married a widow, Margaret Taylor, at St Mary's Roman Catholic Church, Shaw Street, Oldham.

Hogan was 30 years old, and a sergeant in the 2nd Battalion, The Manchester Regiment, British Army, during the First World War. On 29 October 1914 near Festubert, France, he performed a deed along with Second Lieutenant James Leach for which he was awarded the Victoria Cross.

Their citation reads:

Medal
He received the medal in 1914 from King George V, at a ceremony in Buckingham Palace. His medal is in Oldham Civic Centre, Oldham, Greater Manchester.

References

Further reading
 Monuments to Courage (David Harvey, 1999)
 The Register of the Victoria Cross (This England, 1997)
 VCs of the First World War - 1914 (Gerald Gliddon, 1994)

British World War I recipients of the Victoria Cross
Manchester Regiment soldiers
British Army personnel of World War I
1884 births
1943 deaths
People from Royton
British Army recipients of the Victoria Cross
Military personnel from Lancashire